Physician Data Query (PDQ) is the US National Cancer Institute's (NCI) comprehensive cancer database. It contains peer-reviewed summaries on cancer treatment, screening, prevention, genetics, and supportive care, and complementary and alternative medicine; a registry of more than 6,000 open and 17,000 closed cancer clinical trials from around the world; and a directory of professionals who provide genetics services.

PDQ makes available two data resources. The PDQ NCI Cancer Terms Database is a resource of cancer-related terms, curated by a multidisciplinary panel of reviewers, that is released monthly. The NCI Drug Dictionary is a structured list of technical definitions and synonyms for drugs/agents used to treat patients with cancer or conditions related to cancer.

The NCI also makes a browse-able version of the Cancer Terms database available as part of the NCI Terminology Browser

References

External links
 Physician Data Query website Retrieved 27 November 2018.

Oncology
Databases in the United States
Medical databases